This is the box office list of Indian films that are released in 2021.

Box office collection 
The list of highest-grossing Indian films released in 2021, by worldwide box office gross revenue, are as follows:

Lists of Indian films of 2021 
 
 List of Bollywood films of 2021
 List of Punjabi films of 2021
 List of Indian Bengali films of 2021
 List of Gujarati films of 2021
 List of Kannada films of 2021
 List of Malayalam films of 2021
 List of Marathi films of 2021
 List of Tamil films of 2021
 List of Telugu films of 2021

See also
Bhagavadajjukam, a 2021 Sanskrit language Indian film

References

2021 in Indian cinema
Lists of 2021 films by country or language
2021